The Hun River (渾河, "the muddy river") is a river in Liaoning Province, China, and was formerly one of the largest tributaries of the Liao River.  It was also formerly known as Shen River.  Two of Liaoning's most important cities, the provincial capital Shenyang and the seventh largest city Fushun, are located on the Hun River.

Running 415 kilometres (258 mi) and draining a basin of 11,500 square kilometres (4,400 sq mi), the Hun River has numerous tributaries, 31 of which have catchment areas greater than 100 square kilometres (39 sq mi). It flows through the most populous area of Liaoning Province, including the provincial capital and largest city in Northeast China, Shenyang, as well as the 10th largest city, Fushun.

Name

The name Hun River means "the muddy river." This name comes from the Hun's fast flow speed and high sediment load, which leads to its muddy appearance.

Historically the Hun was also known as Little Liao River. The river's middle section was also formerly known as the Shen River. The capital city Shenyang to the north of the river was named for the Shen River. The lower section is also known as the Clam River.

Geography

The Hun River's headwaters arise from the Qian Mountains, a branch of the Changbai Mountains, where the river is also called Nalu River or Red River, and flows into the 5,437 cubic kilometres (1,304 cu mi) Dahuofang Reservoir, which supplies drinking water to the surrounding cities of Shenyang, Fushun, Liaoyang, Anshan, Panjin, Yingkou, and Dalian.

Until 1958, the Hun River joined the Wailiao River and then the Taizi River near Haicheng. Together, they formed the Daliao River,  which drains into the Liaodong Bay. The confluence of the three rivers was known as "the Trident River."

In 1958, a river engineering project was conducted to address flood control problem in the coastal area near Yingkou. The upper reaches of the Wailiao River at Liujianfang was blocked off, diverting the Liao River towards the Shuangtaizi River. This effectively separated the Hun and Taizi rivers from the main body of Liao River system. Since 1958 the Hun and Taizi rivers are considered an independent river system of their own, and are no longer part of the Liao.

References

Rivers of Liaoning